Thomas Hill (1871 – unknown) was an English footballer who played in the Football League for Stoke.

Career
Hill was born in Market Drayton and played for the local football team before joining Stoke in 1897. He played five matches at the start of the 1897–98 season and scored twice against Liverpool and Derby County. However that match against Derby proved to be his final match for Stoke as he left and joined Leicester Normads.

Career statistics

References

English footballers
Stoke City F.C. players
English Football League players
1871 births
Year of death missing
People from Market Drayton
Association football outside forwards